Llukalkan (Mapuche for "one who causes fear") is a genus of abelisaurid theropod dinosaur from the Late Cretaceous Bajo de la Carpa Formation of Argentina. The type species is Llukalkan aliocranianus.

Discovery and naming 
The holotype of Llukalkan, MAU-Pv-LI-581, consisting of a partial skull, was discovered during 2015 in the La Invernada site in Neuquén Province, Argentina, in the rocks of the Bajo de la Carpa Formation. It was described as belonging to the new taxon Llukalkan aliocranianus in 2021; the generic name is Mapuche for "one who scares" or "one who causes fear", and the specific name is Latin for "different skull".

Description 
Llukalkan is very similar to Viavenator, except that it is smaller and the holes in the skull through which the veins pass are larger and more widely separated from the supraoccipital crest, among other differences. It also has a small posterior air-filled sinus in the middle ear zone, a recessus tympanicus caudalis, that has not been found in any other abelisaurids and thus is an autapomorphy.

Paleobiology 
On account of its unusual ear, it has been theorized than Llukalkan had a keener sense of hearing than other abelisaurids, almost like a crocodile's.

Classification 
Gianechini et al. place Llukalkan as a derived abelisaurid, in the clade Furileusauria. Their cladogram is shown below.

References 

Abelisaurids
Santonian life
Late Cretaceous dinosaurs of South America
Cretaceous Argentina
Bajo de la Carpa Formation
Fossil taxa described in 2021